Deutscher Erzählerpreis may refer to:
 Deutscher Erzählerpreis (1962)
 Deutscher Erzählerpreis (2008)